Unión Deportiva Biescas is a Spanish football team based in Biescas, in the autonomous community of Aragon. Founded in 1945, it currently plays in Tercera División RFEF – Group 17, holding home matches at Campo de Fútbol del Polideportivo Fernando Escartín Coti.

History
Founded in 1945, the club only played regional football until 1990, when it achieved promotion to Tercera División. They suffered immediate relegation after finishing last in their group, and suffered a consecutive relegation in 1992 after finishing 16th in the Regional Preferente.

In 2010, after spending several seasons fluctuating between the fifth and sixth levels, Biescas was relegated to Segunda Regional, the seventh division. They returned to the sixth tier in 2013, and to the fifth in 2017.

On 26 June 2021, Biescas returned to a national division after 31 years, as they achieved promotion to Tercera División RFEF after defeating UD San Lorenzo de Flumen.

Stadium
Biescas' current stadium is the Campo de Fútbol de Polideportivo Fernando Escartín Coti, which was named in honour of Fernando Escartín, a Spanish cyclist born in Biescas.

Season to season

2 seasons in Tercera División RFEF

References

External links
 

Football clubs in Aragon
Association football clubs established in 1945
1945 establishments in Spain